Marco Bandiera (born 12 June 1984) is an Italian former road bicycle racer, who competed professionally between 2008 and 2016 for the , , ,  and  squads.

Major results

2004
 3rd GP Kranj
2005
 2nd Trofeo Alcide Degasperi
 2nd Gran Premio di Poggiana
 5th Trofeo Gianfranco Bianchin
2006
 1st Trofeo Zsšdi
 1st GP Capodarco
 2nd Giro del Casentino
 4th Trofeo Franco Balestra
 9th Giro del Belvedere
 9th Trofeo Città di Brescia
2007
 Giro del Veneto (U23)
1st Stages 1 & 3
 1st Stage 1 Giro della Valle d'Aosta
2008
 9th Giro del Piemonte
2009
 9th Vattenfall Cyclassics
2012
 1st  Mountains classification Tour of Turkey
2013
 6th Omloop Het Nieuwsblad
2014
 1st Sprints classification Giro d'Italia
2015
 1st Sprints classification Giro d'Italia

Grand Tour general classification results timeline

References

External links

Marco Bandiera's profile on Cycling Base

1984 births
Living people
People from Castelfranco Veneto
Italian male cyclists
Cyclists from the Province of Treviso